Raimundo Irineu Serra, also known as Mestre (Master) Irineu, (December 15, 1892 São Vicente Ferrer, Maranhão, Brazil - July 6, 1971) was the founder of a syncretic religion known as Santo Daime.

Irineu was raised Roman Catholic. He later moved to the state of Acre where he worked on rubber plantations. In the city of Brasiléia, which is close to the border of Bolivia, he was in contact with other people from his home state of Maranhão as well as Bolivians, from whom he learned the use of ayahuasca. In these early experiences he encountered the Virgin Mary (the Queen of the Forest) and began receiving the guidance which developed into a religious doctrine throughout the remainder of his long life.

References

External links
Mestre Irineu - Hier gibt's die originalen Texte, die deutschen Übersetzungen und die MP3-Dateien zum freien Download.

Founders of new religious movements
People from Maranhão
1892 births
1971 deaths
Brazilian Christian religious leaders
Former Roman Catholics
Santo Daime